La patota may refer to:

 La patota (1960 film), 1960 film
 Paulina (film) (La patota), 2015 film